The Man Buddha Temple is a Buddhist temple in Sale, Magway Region, Myanmar that houses the Shinbin Maha Laba Man Buddha.

The hollow Buddha image is coated with gold lacquer, and is the largest lacquer Buddha image in Myanmar. The style of the Buddha image dates to c. 1300.

See also 
 Buddhism in Myanmar

References 

Buddhist temples in Myanmar
Buildings and structures in Magway Region
14th-century Buddhist temples